André Pierre Aurèle Gaston Vacherot (5 June 1877 in Paris, France – 22 February 1924 in Rouen, France) was a French male tennis player. He is best remembered for having won the men's singles event of the French Championships on four occasions: 1894, 1895, 1896, and 1901.

His younger brother Michel Vacherot was also a tennis player. Together they won the men's doubles in 1901. For André this was his second doubles victory, as he had already won this title back in 1895 together with the German Christian Winzer.

The two brothers André and Marcel Vacherot were grandsons of the french philosopher Étienne Vacherot.

References

 Bud Collins: Total Tennis – The Ultimate Tennis Encyclopedia (2003 Edition).

19th-century French people
19th-century male tennis players
French Championships (tennis) champions
French male tennis players
1877 births
1924 deaths
Tennis players from Paris